Sant Boi is a railway station on the Llobregat–Anoia Line. It is located in the municipality of Sant Boi de Llobregat, to the south-west of Barcelona, in Catalonia, Spain. It was opened in 1912 together with the rest of the line's section between Barcelona and Martorell. It is served by Barcelona Metro line 8, Baix Llobregat Metro lines S33, S4 and S8, and commuter rail lines R5, R6, R50 and R60.

External links

 Information and photos of the station at trenscat.cat 
 Video on train operations at the station on YouTube

Railway stations in Spain opened in 1912
Barcelona Metro line 8 stations
Stations on the Llobregat–Anoia Line
Transport in Sant Boi de Llobregat
Railway stations in Baix Llobregat